is a private railway company in Mie Prefecture, Japan, which also operates bus lines. The company was founded in 1928 and its initial line, the Sangi Line, originally functioned as a freight line transporting cement, but in recent years it became important as a commuter railway line for Yokkaichi. The Hokusei Line was transferred from Kintetsu ownership in 2003, when Kintetsu abandoned the line.

History

The Sangi Line was opened by Onoda Cement in 1931 as a freight-only line to service its cement plant at Nishi-Fujiwara. Passenger services were introduced in 1952, and in 1954, the line was electrified at 1,500 V DC, and the company purchased an electric locomotive from JNR to haul its cement trains. CTC signalling was commissioned on the line in 1974.

Rolling stock

Sangi Line

EMUs
 801 series - Former Seibu 701 series trains acquired in 1989
 101 series - Former Seibu 401 series trains acquired in 1990
 851 series - Former Seibu 701 series trains acquired in 1995
 751 series 3-car EMUs - Former Seibu 101 series trains acquired in 2009

Electric locomotives
 Class ED45: Since 1954 (includes former Tobu Railway locomotives)
 Class ED301: Former Nankai Class ED5201 acquired in 1984
 Class DeKi 200: Former Chichibu Railway Class DeKi 200 acquired in July 2000 and withdrawn in March 2011

Hokusei Line

EMUs
 130 series - Built in 1954
 200 series - Built in 1959
 140 series - Built in 1960
 270 series - Built in 1977

See also
List of railway companies in Japan

References
This article incorporates material from the corresponding article in the Japanese Wikipedia.

External links 

Railway companies of Japan
Bus companies of Japan
Rail transport in Mie Prefecture
Railway companies established in 1928
1067 mm gauge railways in Japan
2 ft 6 in gauge railways in Japan
1928 establishments in Japan
Companies based in Mie Prefecture